The AfD Hamburg is the state association of the right-wing party Alternative for Germany (German: Alternative für Deutschland) in the German city Hamburg. The state association is led by politician Dirk Nockemann as state chairman. The party succeeded in entering Hamburg's parliament at their first attempt in the 2015 state election.

AfD in the Hamburg Parliament 

The state association was founded in April of 2013. Politician Jörn Kruse was elected as state chairman, Günther Siegert and Kay Gottschalk were elected as deputies, and Erich Marquart was elected as treasurer. As a result, some former members of the parties Die Freiheit and Partei Rechtsstaatlicher Offensive (Schill-Party) joined the state association, so that at the next state executive elections, among others, the former member of the Schill-Partei and former Senator of the Interior Dirk Nockemann was elected deputy chairman. Furthermore, Bernd Baumann was elected third deputy and the board was expanded from seven to nine members.

On May 25, 2014, the state party entered all seven assemblies for the first time in the elections to the district assemblies, with a total of 17 deputies.

In the 2015 state election, the state party received 6.1% of the vote, meaning that eight members on the list were elected as members of the Hamburg Parliament. According to the Statistics Office North, the AfD received over five percent of the constituency votes in 14 constituencies and became the fourth strongest party in five constituencies (constituencies 11, 12, 14, 15 and 17). It received the highest share of the vote in constituency 17, 9.3 percent, and the lowest in constituency 3, 2.8 percent.

In the 2020 Hamburg state elections, the AfD Hamburg received 5.3% of the vote, just surpassing the bare minimum the party needed to stay in parliament.

Party

National Executive Board 

Since November 2021, the National Executive Board has been composed of the following members:

Parliamentary group in the Hamburg Parliament 

Members of the AfD in the Hamburg Parliament as of 2023:

 Dirk Nockemann (Parliamentary Group Chairman; State Chairman)
 Olga Petersen
 Thomas Reich
 Marco Schulz
 Krzysztof Walczak (Parliamentary Managing Director; Deputy State Chairman)
 Alexander Wolf

References 

Alternative for Germany
Politics of Hamburg
State sections of political parties in Germany